The Minister of the Naval Service (Canada) was the federal government minister charged with oversight of the Royal Canadian Navy.

In 1923 the National Defence Act merged the position of Minister of Militia and Defence with the Minister of the Naval Service.

The position was re-established during World War II as the Minister of National Defence for Naval Services (Canada).

List of Ministers
Louis Philippe Brodeur 1910–1911
Rodolphe Lemieux 1911
John Douglas Hazen 1911–1917
Charles Colquhoun Ballantyne 1917–1921
George Perry Graham 1921–1922
vacant 1922–1923

Previous military experience

Ballantyne was Commanding Officer of the 1st Battalion of Grenadier Guards from 1916 to 1917.

Hazen was Paymaster and served in the 3rd New Brunswick Regiment.

See also

 Minister of Militia and Defence
 Minister of Aviation
 Minister of National Defence for Naval Services
 Minister of National Defence for Air
 Minister of Overseas Military Forces

Naval Service
Navy of Canada
Naval ministers